Walter "Gunzo" Humeniuk (June 21, 1929 – 1987) was a trainer and backup goaltender for the Detroit Red Wings and the Chicago Black Hawks of the NHL for much of the 1950s and 1960s, although he was never officially listed as a player. He spent 1948 to 1955 with the Detroit Red Wings. He went to the Chicago Black Hawks in 1955.  It is commonly reported that he was "traded" from Detroit to Chicago, but most likely he was brought over as an assistant trainer/equipment manager by General Manager Tommy Ivan, who had left the Red Wings in 1954 to take over the Blackhawks. From 1955 to 1961, Humeniuk was the Blackhawks' backup goaltender and assistant trainer. He would win 2 Stanley Cup Championships in his career with Detroit in 1950 and Chicago in 1961. He remained with the Blackhawks organization until 1963. He would later open a hockey equipment store in suburban Berwyn, which burned in 1970, then re-opened in River Forest, Illinois. He was elected to the Illinois Hockey Hall of Fame in 2005.

Awards and achievements
1950 Stanley Cup Championship  (Detroit)
1961 Stanley Cup Championship  (Chicago)
2005 Illinois Hockey Hall of Fame inductee

External links

Picture of Walter Humeniuk's Name on the 1950 Stanley Cup Plaque
Picture of Walter Humeniuk's Name on the 1961 Stanley Cup Plaque
Picture of Walter "Gunzo" Humeniuk

1929 births
1987 deaths
Stanley Cup champions
Ice hockey goaltenders
Chicago Blackhawks personnel
Detroit Red Wings personnel
Ice hockey coaches